The Granite Curling Club in Seattle is one of only three dedicated curling clubs on the West Coast of the United States.   Since its founding in 1961, Granite Curling Club has produced more U.S. national championships than any other U.S. club.

Most recent national championships
Women's Championship - 1988 Nancy Langley rink
Men's Championship - 2018 Greg Persinger rink
Men's Juniors - 2020 Luc Violette rink
Mixed National - 2016 Em Good rink
Senior Women's - 2010 Sharon Vukich rink
Mixed Doubles - 2012 Brady Clark and Cristin Clark
Senior Men's - 2020 Joel Larway rink
Source

World Championship medals
Men's
1975 Silver Ed Risling rink
1967 Bronze Bruce Roberts rink
1961 Bronze Frank Crealock rink
1992 Bronze Doug Jones rink
Junior Men's
1981 Bronze Ted Purvis rink
Senior Men's
2015 Gold Lyle Sieg rink

Source

References

External links
Granite Curling Club Home Page

Curling clubs in the United States
1961 establishments in Washington (state)
Curling in Washington (state)
Curling clubs established in 1961